Rhagoletotrypeta argentinensis is a species of tephritid or fruit fly in the genus Rhagoletotrypeta of the family Tephritidae.

References

Trypetinae